Democrat Party may refer to:

Democratic Party (United States) (founded 1828)
Democrat Party (epithet), a pejorative term used by opponents of the Democratic Party
Democrat Party (Chile) (1887–1941)
Democrat Party (Persia) (1909–1919/21)
Democrat Party (Peru, Nicolini) (defunct)
Democrat Party (Thailand) (founded 1946)
Democrat Party (Turkey, 1946–61)
Democrat Party (Turkey, current) (founded 2007)
Democrat Party of Iran (1946–1948)

See also
Democracy Party (disambiguation)
Democrat (disambiguation)
Democratic Party (disambiguation)
Demokrat Parti (disambiguation)

fr:Parti démocrate